Rémi Drolet (born 31 August 2000) is a Canadian cross-country skier.

Early life 
Rémi Drolet was born in Trail, British Columbia. He started cross-country skiing at age 4, but didn't practice it regularly until he was 11. As of 2022, he is enrolled at Harvard University with a concentration in physics but took a leave of absence to attend the Beijing 2022 Olympics.

Career

Junior
At the 2020 Nordic Junior World Ski Championships in Oberwiesenthal, Germany, Drolet was part of the quartet that won silver in the 4 × 5 kilometre relay event, becoming the first Canadians to win a relay medal at the event.  Drolet would follow that up with a fourth-place finish in the 30 km event.

Senior
Drolet competed at the FIS Nordic World Ski Championships 2021, with his top finish coming in the 4 × 10 kilometre relay, where he finished 10th.

On January 21, 2022, Drolet was officially named to Canada's 2022 Olympic team after Canada was awarded an additional berth.

Cross-country skiing results
All results are sourced from the International Ski Federation (FIS).

Olympic Games

Distance reduced to 30 km due to weather conditions.

World Championships

World Cup

Season standings

References

External links
 

2000 births
Living people
Canadian male cross-country skiers
Sportspeople from Trail, British Columbia
Cross-country skiers at the 2022 Winter Olympics
Olympic cross-country skiers of Canada
Harvard Crimson skiers